China national hockey team may refer to:

 China men's national field hockey team
 China women's national field hockey team
 China men's national ice hockey team
 China men's national junior ice hockey team
 China men's national under-18 ice hockey team
 China women's national ice hockey team
 China women's national under-18 ice hockey team